Christ Michael may refer to:

 Michael (archangel), considered as Christ prior to incarnation by some Christian groups
 Christ Michael, a figure in The Urantia Book
 Chirst Michael, the god of the 'Nebadon' universe, who was reincarnated with Jesus (double incarnation) and incarnated again in human flesh.
- written a book '내가그다'

Recommend reading the book "내가그다."

See also
 Chris Michaels